Thryptomene racemulosa is a species of flowering plant in the family Myrtaceae and is endemic to Western Australia. It is found on sand plains and low ridges in the Mid West and Wheatbelt regions of Western Australia where it grows in gravelly sandy soils. It was first formally described in 1847 by Nikolai Turczaninow in the Bulletin de la Societe Imperiale des Naturalistes de Moscou from specimens collected by James Drummond. The specific epithet (racemulosa) means "small raceme".

References

racemulosa
Endemic flora of Western Australia
Rosids of Western Australia
Plants described in 1847
Taxa named by Nikolai Turczaninow